Kayden Leighton Hugh Pierre (born February 16, 2003) is an American professional soccer player who plays for Major League Soccer club Sporting Kansas City.

Career
Pierre began playing with Michigan-based USSDA club Vardar SC in 2016, before moving to the academy side of Major League Soccer club Sporting Kansas City in 2018. On August 28, 2020, Pierre signed an academy-contract with Kansas City's USL Championship side Sporting Kansas City II.

On September 22, 2020, Pierre appeared as an 65th-minute substitute during a 4–0 loss to Austin Bold.

On May 4, 2021, Pierre signed to Kansas City's Major League Soccer roster as a homegrown player.

References

External links 
 Sporting KC profile
 

2003 births
Living people
American soccer players
Association football defenders
People from Rochester Hills, Michigan
Soccer players from Michigan
Sporting Kansas City II players
USL Championship players
Sporting Kansas City players
Homegrown Players (MLS)
United States men's under-20 international soccer players
Major League Soccer players
MLS Next Pro players